Saadnayel is a town in the Bekaa Valley in the Zahlé District of Lebanon. It has a population of around 52,500, mostly Sunnis. 

The town is located strategically near the crossroads between the Beirut-Damascus highway and the main road connecting the northern and southern Beqaa.

History
In 1838, Eli Smith noted Saadnayel's population being Sunni Muslim.

The town has been the site of sporadic Sunni-Shia violence.

Up to 35,000 refugees of the Syrian Civil War have also settled in the town.

References

Bibliography

 

  

Populated places in Zahlé District
Sunni Muslim communities in Lebanon